Rwanda Energy Group BBC, commonly known as REG, is a Rwandan basketball club based in Kigali. It is owned and named after the company Rwanda Energy Group Limited. It plays in the Rwanda Basketball League (RBL), the highest tier of basketball in Rwanda. REG has won the national championship thrice, in 2017, 2021 and 2022.

The club played in the Sahara Conference of the Basketball Africa League (BAL) as of the 2022 season. The team shares a rivalry with Patriots BBC.

History
Established in 2016, the club won the NBL Rwanda in 2017. Then, REG played in an African competition for the first time when it entered the 2018–19 Africa Basketball League.

On 2 November 2019, Henry Mwinuka signed for two years as the new head coach.

On 30 October 2021, REG won its first Rwandan national championship after defeating arch-rivals Patriots 2–0 in the finals. Olivier Shyaka was named the league's Most Valuable Player after scoring 30 points in Game 1 and 22 points in Game 2. As a result of the championship, REG also qualified for the 2022 season of the Basketball Africa League (BAL). On February 18, 2022, the team signed ex-NBA player and coach Robert Pack as its new head coach.

The team won their third national title after once again defeating Patriots in the finals, 3–2, in the 2022 season.

Honours
Rwanda Basketball League
Champions (3): 2017, 2021, 2022
Runners-up (3): 2018, 2019, 2020
Heroes Cup
Winners (3): 2018, 2019, 2020

Season by season

RS: Regular season
QF: Quarterfinals

In African competitions
FIBA Africa Basketball League  (1 appearance)
2018–19 – Group Stage
Basketball Africa League  (1 appearances)

 2022 – Quarterfinalist

Players

Current roster
The following roster is REG's final team for the 2022 BAL season.

Notable players
 Kubwimana Kazingufu Ali (2018–)

Head coaches
 Henry Mwinuka (2019–2022)
 Robert Pack (2022 BAL season)

References

External links
Rwanda Energy Group BBC at Eurobasket.com

Basketball teams in Rwanda
Basketball teams established in 2016
Basketball Africa League teams